Ctenophorus vadnappa, commonly known as the red-barred dragon or red-barred crevice-dragon is a species of agamid lizard occurring in rocky outcrops and ranges in semi-arid to arid South Australia, from the northern Flinders Ranges to hills north of Lake Torrens.

References

Agamid lizards of Australia
vadnappa
Endemic fauna of Australia
Reptiles described in 1974
Taxa named by Terry Francis Houston